SoHo was an Australian pay television channel. Originally launched as FX in 1995 and oriented towards classic programming, it was rebranded as W. and shifted its focus to women's programming on 1 November 2003. Later, on 20 August 2012, it was again rebranded as SoHo and shifted its focus to drama television series.

The channel closed down on 4 October 2016, and was replaced by Binge.

History

In 1995, FX, then stylised as fX, was launched in Australia on Foxtel, featuring classic TV series (often branded as "Golden Years of Television").

In late 1998 fX became FX, which at the time was a channel aimed at women, unlike the international FX channels demographic, featuring shows such as The View and Donny and Marie.

The channel became available on Austar in April 1999.

In late 2000, FX was again rebranded, officially becoming "Australia's first TV channel for women".

It was relaunched as W. on 1 November 2003, shortly before digital broadcasting began. W screened original Australian programming such as Beauty and the Beast, Love My Way, From Here to Maternity and Studio A with Simon Burke. It also had Pay-TV rights to many popular US primetime drama series such as Pushing Daisies and The Wire and repeats of many other series.

Antonia Kidman, sister of actress Nicole Kidman, was the face of the W channel, for quite some time and has presented a few parenting and entertainment programs for this and other channels. W2, the timeshift channel broadcasting programs two hours later, was launched in September 2006. A website for the channel was also launched in September 2006.

W. underwent a transformation in April 2009, which included an updated logo (now simply W) and several new additions to the primetime line-up. W HD was launched on 15 November 2009, on both Austar and Foxtel.

In 2012, it was announced that SoHo was to broadcast the new Australian drama Wentworth, a re-imaging of the classic television show Prisoner.  The series started airing on 1 May 2013.

The channel closed on 30 September 2016, with existing programs being moved to other channels. Most programs migrated to Showcase, with a handful of other titles moving to TV H!TS, Arena and FOX8.

Programming

Original programming
Love My Way (2004 on FOX8, 2005 on W Channel, 2007 on Showcase)
Beauty and the Beast (2005–2007)
Spirited (2010–2011)
Wentworth (2013–2016)
A Place to Call Home (2013–2014 on Seven, 2015 on SoHo)

Acquired programming on SoHo

A Place to Call Home (seasons 1 & 2)
Any Human Heart
Army Wives
Band of Brothers
Big Love
Boardwalk Empire
Bored to Death
The Borgias
Boss
Burn Notice
The Closer
Cloudstreet
Curb Your Enthusiasm
Dallas
Damages
Enlightened
Entourage
Friday Night Lights
Game of Thrones
Girls
The Glades
Graceland
How to Make It in America
In Treatment
John Adams
The Killing
Labyrinth
 Las Vegas 
 Law & Order
 Law & Order: Criminal Intent
Leverage
The Client List
The Listener
Longmire
Love/Hate
Luck
Magic City
Major Crimes
Men of a Certain Age
Mildred Pierce
Nashville
The Newsroom (moved to showcase)
Rizzoli & Isles
Shameless
Six Feet Under
The Sopranos
Southland
Tangle
Touch
Treme
True Blood
Veep
Weeds
The West Wing
White Collar
The White Queen
World Without End

Acquired programming on W

The Border
Boston Legal (moved to 111 Greats)
Cold Case (moved to 111 Greats)
The Dr. Oz Show (moved to Arena)
Dr. Phil
Extreme Makeover: Home Edition (moved to LifeStyle Home)
General Hospital
Jeopardy! (moved to Fox Classics)
Kevin Hill
Law & Order (moved to 111 Greats)
The Mentalist (moved to Arena, then Fox8)
The Nate Berkus Show
The Oprah Winfrey Show
Outrageous Fortune (moved to Arena)
Pushing Daisies
Raising the Bar
The View
The Wire
Without a Trace (moved to 111 Greats)
The Young and the Restless (moved to Arena)
Sex and the CityRachael Ray
''Montel Williams

References

External links
Official site

Television networks in Australia
Women's interest channels
English-language television stations in Australia
1995 establishments in Australia
Television channels and stations established in 1995
Television channels and stations disestablished in 2016
Defunct television channels in Australia
Foxtel